Panchakanya or Panchkanya may refer to:

Panchkanya (पञ्चकन्या):
 Panchakanya: five heroines in Hindu epics
 Panchkanya, Nuwakot, Nepal

Panchakanya (पाँचकन्या):
Panchakanya, Kosi, Nepal
Panchakanya, Mechi, Nepal
Panchakanya Pokhari, Nepal